Chiquito is the name of:

 Chiquito (actor) (1932–1997), Filipino comedic film actor
 Chiquito (restaurant), a chain of UK restaurants specialising Mexican foods
 Chiquito (Medal of Honor), Native American enlistee in the United States Army
 Chiquito (Tintin character), a character in The Adventures of Tintin
 Chiquito de la Calzada (1932–2017), Spanish comedian
 Chiquito (restaurant), a restaurant chain in the United Kingdom
 Chiquito, a song by Arca from Kick IIIII

Other 
 Chiquito River (disambiguation)

Chiquitos 
 Chiquitos,  a Spanish name given to the ethnic peoples of part of Bolivia